Liautaud is a surname. Notable people with the surname include:

André Liautaud (1906–1951), Haitian diplomat and politician
James P. Liautaud (1936–2015), American academic
Jimmy John Liautaud (born 1964), American businessman and restaurateur
Martine Liautaud, businesswoman
Parker Liautaud (born 1994), American explorer and environmentalist